The  is a far-right political party in Japan founded by Makoto Sakurai.

History

On August 15, 2016, Sakurai announced in front of a crowd at the annual gathering to protest the Hantenren in front of Yasukuni Shrine that he would not stop at the Tokyo election, and would create a new political party to prioritize and benefit the people of Japan over foreign powers.

The JFP held its first convention in APA Hotel on February 26, 2017, and Sakurai, who was until then de facto leader, formally became leader of the JFP.

As of April 27, 2017, there are about 1800 party members, but no members of the party in any government office. The same day, sitting beside Sakurai, formally announced at a press conference his plan to run for the upcoming Tokyo Prefecture Legislature Election (ja) in July 2017.

In 2021, Makoto Sakurai ran for the Tokyo gubernatorial election and received 178,784 votes (2.92％).
The Japan First Party ran in the 2021 Japanese general election running a total of 5 candidates, with 33,611 votes (0.52%) and Makoto Sakurai having 9,449 votes (3.96%) in the Tokyo 15th District.

The Japan First Party ran in the 2022 Japanese House of Councillors election running a total of 10 candidates, with 109,046 proportional votes (0.21%) and 74,097 constituency votes (0.14%).

Policies 
Many of the promises from Sakurai's campaign in the Tokyo gubernatorial election have been included in the policies outlined by the JFP such as the exclusion of foreigners from receiving welfare. The policies include the rewriting of the Japanese constitution from scratch to put the Emperor as the head of state, install a military, and make defense of the country a civic duty. JFP is also evaluated as an alt-right group.

Election results

House of Representatives

House of Councillors

Tokyo Gubernatorial

See also 
 America First (policy)
 Netto-uyoku

References

Notes 

Zaitokukai
2016 establishments in Japan
Anti-communist organizations in Japan
Anti-immigration politics in Asia
Anti-Korean sentiment in Japan
Alt-right organizations
Alt-right in Asia
Far-right political parties
Far-right politics in Japan
Identity politics in Japan
Monarchist parties in Japan
Nationalist parties in Japan
Right-wing populism in Japan
Conservatism in Japan
Political parties established in 2016
Political parties in Japan